Torodora typhlopis is a moth in the family Lecithoceridae. It was described by Edward Meyrick in 1911. It is found in southern India.

The forewings are glossy dark purplish fuscous. The stigmata are represented by black spots, the first discal small, round and confluent with a large trapezoidal plical beneath it, the second discal moderate and transverse. The hindwings are fuscous, in females rather darker.

References

Moths described in 1911
Torodora